The 1999 FINA Women's Water Polo World Cup was the twelfth edition of the event, organised by the International Swimming Federation (FINA). The event took place in Winnipeg, Manitoba, Canada from May 24 to May 29, 1999. Participating teams were the eight leading teams from the World Championships. The tournament served as a qualifier for the 2000 Summer Olympics in Sydney, Australia. Automatically the first ranked teams from Europe and the Americas, plus one team from the host country, qualified. Other teams could qualify at the 2000 Olympic Games Qualifying Tournament, held from April 22 to April 30 in Palermo, Italy.

Teams

GROUP A
 
 

 

GROUP B

Preliminary round

GROUP A

May 24, 1999

May 25, 1999

May 26, 1999

GROUP B

May 24, 1999

May 25, 1999

May 26, 1999

Semifinals
May 28, 1999

Finals
May 29, 1999 — Seventh place

May 29, 1999 — Fifth place

May 29, 1999 — Bronze Medal

May 29, 1999 — Gold Medal

Final ranking

*The Netherlands and Canada qualified for the 2000 Summer Olympics in Sydney, Australia

Individual awards
Most Valuable Player

Best Goalkeeper
???

References

  FINA
  Zwemkroniek Actueel (June 5, 1999)

FINA Women's Water Polo World Cup
International water polo competitions hosted by Canada
W
Water Polo World Cup
May 1999 sports events in Canada
Women's water polo in Canada
Sports competitions in Winnipeg
1999 in Manitoba